The BRM P75 was a 3-litre (183 cu. in.) H16 motor racing engine, developed by BRM.

Background

Regulation changes
Up until that point, BRM was challenging at the top with Lotus, Cooper and Ferrari.

Development
BRM decided to hedge their bets by developing their existing 16 valve 1.5 litre V8 into a 32 valve 3 litre H16 (effectively two flat 8s, one on top of the other and geared together) while also developing a new 48 valve 3 litre V12 in partnership with Harry Weslake and opt for whichever turned out to be the better powerplant. After much debate, Sir Alfred Owen decided BRM would go with the H16 and Weslake bought out BRM's involvement in the V12 and produced the engine that went on to power the Eagle T1G. The H16's development was complicated by BRM's involvement in two further V12 designs and a 4.2 litre version of the H16 for Lotus to use at the 1966 Indianapolis 500.

Reliability
Various crankshaft vibration problems dogged the engine from the start, and to compound matters quick-fix balancing weights attached to the crankshafts developed the unfortunate habit of detaching themselves and flying off within the engines causing several catastrophic engine failures. Each side of the engine had to have its own water radiator, fuel metering unit, distributor and water pump, with a common oil radiator. The first sign of trouble with the H16 came when the new engine arrived at the Team Lotus factory in Hethel, Norfolk and it required four men to lift it from the BRM truck to get into the Lotus factory. The sheer complexity of the engine led to a truly terrible record of unreliability with engine, transmission and related problems caused 27 of the powerplant's 30 retirements from 40 races.

Formula One World Championship results
(key) (Races in bold indicate pole position) (Races in italics indicate fastest lap)

References

Formula One engines